In photography, soft focus is a lens flaw, in which the lens forms images that are blurred due to spherical aberration. A soft focus lens deliberately introduces spherical aberration in order to give the appearance of blurring the image while retaining sharp edges; it is not the same as an out-of-focus image, and the effect cannot be achieved simply by defocusing a sharp lens. Soft focus is also the name of the style of photograph produced by such a lens.

Photography

Because soft focus results from what are considered technical flaws, typically spherical and chromatic aberration, many older lenses had soft focus built in as a side effect of their construction.  Some lens makers, such as Pinkham-Smith and Busch Nicola Perscheid (see Nicola Perscheid), intentionally designed lenses to take advantage of these flaws and, as color became available, chromatic aberration was less desirable, but well-managed spherical aberration was desirable.  Newer lenses are optimized to minimize optical aberrations, but there are lenses such as the Canon EF 135mm lens f/2.8 with Softfocus, Pentax SMC 28mm f2.8 FA Soft Lens, Mamiya 180mm f/4.0 Soft Focus Lens for 645 Cameras, and the Lensbaby Velvet 56mm lens, which have adjustable levels of spherical aberration at wide apertures. The effect can be disabled entirely as well, in which case the lens is sharp.

In the mid-1930s, Leitz designed a legendary soft-focus lens, the Thambar 90mm f2.2, for the Leica rangefinder cameras. It was made in small numbers, no more than 3000 units. It is a rare collector's item today. In 2017, a new version was produced, costing $6,495. A lens from the original series can fetch between $3,000 and $8,000, depending on condition. The soft focus effect is used as an effect for glamour photography, because the effect eliminates blemishes, and in general produces a dream-like image.

The effect of a soft focus lens is sometimes approximated by the use of diffusion filter or other method, such as stretching a nylon stocking over the front of the lens, or smearing petroleum jelly on a clear filter or on the front element or even the back element of the lens itself. The latter is less recommended because successive cleaning always introduces a risk to damage the lens's surface.

It can also be approximated with post-processing procedures.  Specifically, highlights in an image are blurred, but the bokeh effects of soft focus cannot be reproduced.

See also
Rodenstock Imagon

Aberration in optical systems
Lens (optics)
Special effect
Bokeh
Convolution
Depth of field
Low-pass filter
Gaussian blur

References

External links

Soft Focus Lens Article
Soft-Focus Lenses and Techniques, an overview for large format photographers

Photographic lenses
Science of photography
Photographic techniques
Photography by genre

de:Weichzeichnung